Colonel David Vance was an American soldier during the Revolutionary War.

Personal life
Vance was born near Winchester, Virginia, circa 1745, the oldest son of Samuel Vance and descended from the DeVaux family in Normandy. The name Vance is a corruption of DeVaux.

Around 1774 he settled on the Catawba River in Rowan County, later Burke County, and married there, Priscilla Brank, daughter of Robert Brank.

Military career
Serving in the Revolutionary War as an American soldier in the North, he was an ensign, and at the battles of Brandywine, Germantown and at Valley Forge.  In the South he was at the battles of Musgrove Mill and Kings Mountain.

After the war he settled at Vanceville on Reems Creek, Burke County, which is now Buncombe County.  In 1786 and 1791 he was a member from Burke County of the North Carolina House of Commons and in 1791 he and Colonel William Davidson from Rutherford County introduced in that house petitions to create the County of Buncombe.

In 1792 he became and remained the Clerk of the County Court of that new county in whose minutes his beautiful penmanship appears.  He, and General Joseph McDowell and Mussendine Matthews as North Carolina commissioners superintended in 1799 the running of the line between North Carolina and Tennessee from the southern border of Virginia southwardly across Big Pigeon River.  In consequence of some conversation when engaged in that work he wrote recollections of the Battle of Kings Mountain published many years after his death.  He was a colonel of militia.

In 1813 he died and was buried at his farm on Reems Creek.

Epitaph
The Daughters of the American Revolution purchased a stone to mark David Vance's grave, which reads: "Soldier of the Revolution, Lieut 2nd N.C. Continental Rect, Brandy Wine, Germantown, Monmouth, Valley Forge, Kings Mountain.  Member of General Assembly N.C. 1785-6-9. State Boundary and Land Coms. Colonel of Militia; Clerk of Buncombe Court."

References

External links
 
Old Buncombe First Family Website
Vance Birthplace State Historic Site, Weaverville, NC

People from Virginia
1745 births
1813 deaths